The School of Public Policy and Management (SPPM) at Tsinghua University is a public policy and public administration school located in Beijing, China. SPPM is headquartered in the Wu Shunde Building on Zhongguancun East Road on the university mall between the Tsinghua University School of Economics and Management to its north and the Journalism and Communication to its south. The school offers Master and Doctoral educational programmes.

Academics
It was founded in 2000. The School offers a two-year Master of Public Administration in International Development and a taught in English and geared to international students.  A one year International Master in Public Administration (IMPA) course is offered by the school that is aimed at giving additional training to government officials from developing countries.  The Master of Public Policy (MPP) program is also a two-year program offered by the school that aims at preparing students for careers in the public sector.  It also offers a two-year Master’s in Public Administration which is entirely taught in Mandarin.  A PhD in Public Management is also offered at the school.

Research centres 
Health and Development Institute
Center for Industrial Development and Environmental Governance
Center for China Studies (CCS)
Institute of Government Management and Innovation (IGMI)
Center for Crisis Management Research (CCMR)
Public Policy Institute
Brookings-Tsinghua Center for Public Policy
The Center for Innovation and Social Responsibility
Institute of Taiwan Studies (ITS)
NGO Research Center
Center for Anti-corruption and Governance

Notable SPPM faculty 
 Hu Angang
 Cui Zhiyuan
Xue Lan
Xiaojuan Jiang

References 

Tsinghua University
Public policy schools